Sergio D'Elia (born 5 May 1952 in Pontecorvo, Italy) is an Italian politician, activist and former left-wing terrorist, now a human rights supporter and advocate of non-violence.

D'Elia spent 12 years in prison for his affiliation to the terrorist organization Prima Linea; in 1986 he abandoned the armed struggle and Marxist ideology by adopting a left libertarian position, and soon joined the Radical Party (a socially liberal and libertarian political organization).

Then, he founded in Rome (1993), with his first wife Mariateresa Di Lascia, Marco Pannella and former EU commissioner Emma Bonino (all politicians of Radical Party), the non-government group Hands Off Cain ("Nessuno tocchi Caino"), which fights against the death penalty and torture in the world.

The great success of D'Elia and HOC was the United Nations moratorium on the death penalty (2007), proposed by Italy's government.

He was an Italian Parliament member from 2006 to 2008.

Notes

External links
 Hands Off Cain Official Website (English version)

1952 births
Living people
People from Pontecorvo
Radical Party (Italy) politicians
Italian Radicals politicians
Deputies of Legislature XV of Italy
Politicians of Lazio
Nonviolence advocates
Years of Lead (Italy)
Italian communists
Terrorism in Italy
Italian revolutionaries
People convicted on terrorism charges
Italian libertarians
Anti–death penalty activists
Italian activists
Italian human rights activists